Leonard M. Tillem (June 9, 1944 – January 13, 2022) was an American attorney and radio broadcaster. He hosted "The Len Tillem Show," which is considered to be one of the first legal affairs radio show in the U.S.

Early life 
Tillem was born on June 9, 1944 in The Bronx in New York City, New York to Jewish immigrants from Poland that spoke Yiddish. He grew up in Belle Harbor, Queens. He attended Far Rockaway High School, graduating in 1962.  He earned his Juris Doctor (J.D.) from the New York University School of Law and was admitted to the State Bar of California on January 18, 1972.

Career
Tillem got his start in radio in 1990 on Napa Valley's KVON. He moved onto KSRO in Santa Rose before San Francisco mega-station KGO gave him a Sunday afternoon show in 2000. His show would eventually move to the noon weekday timeslot, where it was the highest ranked program. 

On December 1, 2011, KGO changed to an all-news format and terminated the employment of all of its weekday radio program hosts except for Ronn Owens. Tillem resumed his radio program on the Bay Area radio station KKSF NewsTalk 910 AM San Francisco on January 3, 2012.

Tillem ceased broadcasting on NewsTalk 910 on March 29, 2013. From then until July 23, 2013, he continued his radio program exclusively on the web via podcasts.

Personal life 
Tillem's niece, Joya Tillem, is a physician and the wife of filmmaker Jon Favreau.

He died on January 13, 2022, at the age of 77 at his home in Sonoma, California.

References

External links
 Len Tillem & Associates — Tillem's law practice
 Len Tillem's show podcasts
 
 

1944 births
2022 deaths
People from the Bronx
California lawyers
Lawyers from New York City
American podcasters
American radio personalities
New York University School of Law alumni